The Strehareți is a left tributary of the river Olt in Romania. It flows into the Olt near the city of Slatina.

References

Rivers of Olt County
Rivers of Romania